Teststrecke, meaning Test Track in German, is a portable steel roller coaster owned by the German showman partnership Meyer & Rosenzweig. It was imported from Dorney Park & Wildwater Kingdom in 2008 and generally tours in Germany, with occasional visits to the Netherlands. It was designed by renowned ride engineer Anton Schwarzkopf. The ride was previously named Laser and Colossus.

The trains on Teststrecke are themed to resemble racing cars and are, just like the trains on the Boomerang coaster at the Wiener Prater, designed by SAT Consulting. Each train has a single lap bar to secure riders in their seats. It can operate all three at peak times, but it runs with one when there are no queues. The coaster is portable in that it is not attached to the ground, but is anchored by pools of water.

During normal operations at Dorney Park, there was no bag storage on the ride platform, so guests had to take everything with them. Guests were also not allowed to choose their own seats, as ride operators often assigned seats.
It was last seen at Jeddah Season's Jeddah Pier

The ride

The ride starts with a slow 93-foot chain lift hill, leading to a right hand near-vertical curved first drop, followed by two consecutive vertical loops. The ride then turns into a left-hand helix, up and through the center of the second loop. Another left turn helix leads down and straight upward diagonally between the vertical loops, followed by a 360-degree helix, starting from the right, leading into a brake run that leads into two right turns and back into the station.

Portable roller coasters